Nevsky Prospekt is a station on the Moskovsko-Petrogradskaya Line of the Saint Petersburg Metro. It serves the street of the same name, one of the largest in the city.

The station was opened on July 1, 1963. While the station itself was designed by Mayofis and  Maximov, the interior was designed by Getskin, Shuvalova and Andreyev. The station has two sets of exits on Mikhailovskya Street.

The station is linked to Gostiny Dvor via a transfer corridor that descends to the middle of the platform and a set of escalators at the platform's northern end. 

Nevsky Prospekt is considered one of the most congested stations in the entire Saint Petersburg Metro.

Nevsky Prospekt is one of the more exotic locations used in Mornington Crescent, a game played in the BBC Radio 4 show I'm Sorry I Haven't a Clue.

References

External links

Saint Petersburg Metro stations
Nevsky Prospekt
Railway stations in Russia opened in 1963
1963 establishments in the Soviet Union
Metro
Railway stations located underground in Russia